Christ the King College also referred to by its acronym CKC is a basic education institution run by the Missionary Sisters of the Immaculate Heart of Mary in San Fernando City, La Union, Philippines. Founded in 1931 by the ICM Sisters, it is one of the oldest Catholic institutions in La Union and the Ilocos Region. Like St. Theresa's College in Quezon City and four others, it is one of the six Immaculati Cordis Mariae (ICM) schools in the country founded by Mother Marie Louise De Meester and ran by Belgian Sisters.

Christ the King College offers elementary and secondary education, with its elementary education situated in the heart of city of San Fernando, and its secondary education situated in Sevilla Campus.

In 2010, CKC celebrated the centennial anniversary of ICM's presence in the Philippines, and in 2011, CKC celebrated its 80th anniversary, under the leadership of Sr. Teresita A. Lara, ICM.

History
On June 10, 1910, when Mo. Marie Louise de Meester, ICM's mother foundress, stepped into the islands of the Philippines. It was then when they started building up schools administered later on by the Belgium - based sisters. In May 1917, two priests, Fr. Donato and Fr. Albano, founded the San Fernando Catholic School within the heart of the town of San Fernando in the province of La Union.

May 12, 1931 marked the arrival in San Fernando of the missionaries of the Canonesses of  St. Augustine, now called Missionary Sisters of the Immaculate Heart of Mary (ICM sisters). The two priests, Fr. Donato and Fr. Albano, then turned over the administration of the parish school to the ICM sisters.

In 1946, the school offered the Elementary Teacher's Certificate. Subsequently, it was named Christ the King Junior College.

In 1959, the school was renamed Christ the King College. It then offered the degree of Bachelor of Science in Elementary Education. However, in collaboration with the CICM Fathers, the rights of the college department was transferred to St.Louis College in 1971. Responding to the growing population of the elementary department, the high school complex was put up in the area of Sevilla. Operations in the new site started on June 4, 1997.

In 2006, CKC celebrated its 75 years of committed service to Catholic Education. At present, the school continues to extend its services to the community through its Community Involvement Program.

In 2010, CKC celebrated the ICM's Centennial Anniversary, and under the leadership of Sr. Teresita A. Lara, ICM, celebrated her 80th anniversary in 2011.

In 2012, CKC was granted an initial accreditation by Philippine Accrediting Association of Schools, Colleges and Universities (PAASCU). The accreditation for Elementary Department was valid until March 2015, and the accreditation for High School Department is valid until May 2015.

On 14 December 2015, PAASCU re-accredited the school's level for both departments, for five years, until May 2020.

Up to this day, CKC is one of the six ICM Schools in the Country, together with the following:
St. Theresa's College, Quezon City
St. Theresa's College, Cebu City
St. Augustine School, Tagudin, Ilocos Sur
St. Francis Academy (Balamban, Cebu)
St. Louis School Center, Baguio City

School Attributions

Colors
The colors of Christ the King College are yellow and red: which represents royal priesthood and devoted service, respectively.

Seal
The CKC logo represents a symbolism through its different components. The cross represents Catholicism, while the crown represents Christ's Kingship, which is also the patron of the institution. The shield, meanwhile, represents Christ the King College as a vanguard of Catholic principles and values, and its three-pronged sides represent the three-fold mission of Christ: Priestly, kingly and prophetic. The circular figure, meanwhile, represents the universality of Christ's love.

Notable alumni
Fr. Bienvenido Nebres, SJ, mathematician, composer, 29th president of Ateneo de Manila University, and a National Scientist
Jessica Soho, award-winning journalist, documentarian, and news director of GMA
Hon. Georgina D. Hidalgo, First Woman Elected President, Philippine Judges Association

References

External links
 

Catholic elementary schools in the Philippines
Catholic secondary schools in the Philippines
Schools in La Union